Inchture Tramways operated a horse-drawn tramway service in Inchture between 1849 and 1916.

History

The tramway ran from the village of inchture to Inchture Village railway station on the Dundee and Perth Railway line.

Closure

The service was closed in 1916 and the tracks were taken to France to assist in the war effort.

References

Tram transport in Scotland
1849 establishments in Scotland
Transport in Perth and Kinross